Kenya Electricity Transmission Company Limited, commonly referred to as KETRACO, is a wholly-owned parastatal of the Government of Kenya which serves as the primary Transmission System Operator in the Republic of Kenya.

Location
The headquarters of KETRACO are located at Kawi Complex, Popo Lane, Off Red Cross Road, in the South C neighbourhood of Nairobi, the capital city of Kenya.

Overview 
Before 2008, bulk transmission in Kenya was carried out by Kenya Power and Lighting Company. KETRACO was incorporated in December 2008 and entrusted with taking over the role of bulk electricity transmission in the country as well as maintenance of the National Transmission Grid. It is mandated to "plan, design, construct, own, operate and maintain high voltage electricity transmission grids, as well as the regional interconnectors". It is responsible for high voltage lines and substations with 132kV and above.

KETRACO maintains electricity grid networks and transformers of 132kV, 220kV, 400kV and 500kV. The company is also responsible for designing, building and maintaining interconnectors with neighboring foreign countries. This allows Kenya to sell to, buy from or transmit electricity between her neighbors and to participate in the Eastern Africa Power Pool.

See also
 Kenya Electricity Generating Company

References

External links
 KETRACO official page

Companies based in Nairobi
Government-owned companies of Kenya
Electric power transmission system operators in Kenya
Energy companies established in 2008
Kenyan companies established in 2008
Electric power companies of Kenya